The Siebel ferry (Siebelfähre) was a shallow-draft catamaran landing craft operated by Germany's Wehrmacht during World War II. It served a variety of roles (transport, flak ship, gunboat, convoy escort, minelayer) in the Mediterranean, Baltic and Black Seas as well as along the English Channel. They were originally developed for Operation Sea Lion in 1940, the cancelled German invasion of England. Siebel ferries continued performing after the war's end in 1945.

Origins and development
As German Army preparations for Operation Sea Lion got under way in July 1940, frustration soon grew over when and what types of ships the Kriegsmarine would supply for use in the planned Channel crossing. The immense task of converting hundreds of inland river barges and motor coasters into proper landing craft began, and the Kriegsmarine was unable to give the Army a date for their availability.

Anxious to begin landing exercises, Feldmarschall Walther von Brauchitsch finally ordered General of Engineers Jacob to build sea-going transports for the army. Jacob assigned this task to Pionier-Battalion 47 of VII Army Corps. The battalion moved to Carteret on the western side of the Cotentin Peninsula, and the men of this unit searched the French countryside for materials with which to construct self-propelled rafts and ferries.

Aircraft designer Fritz Siebel (a colonel in the Luftwaffe), putting a captured aircraft plant near Amiens in north-eastern France back into production, was approached by a lieutenant-colonel from Pionier-Battalion 47. The colonel asked Siebel if he could requisition a large pile of empty gasoline containers discarded outside next to the plant. Siebel agreed to part with the cache, provided the colonel explained what use he would make of them. The answer interested Siebel, and got him pondering the question of how to ferry troops and heavy equipment across the English Channel given the time and materials.

Pionier-Battalion 47 began experimenting with a host of makeshift materials for constructing powered rafts, including wine barrels, tree trunks, kapok-filled sacks, and ship's canvas. Early efforts to use open-ended river-crossing pontoons came to nothing. The iron beams and bolts used to hold them together failed to stand up to the waves, and the pontoons were overwhelmed in a light sea.

During development, someone at Oberkommando des Heeres (German high command) thought of using a larger closed-end bridging pontoon developed during World War I by Austrian Colonel of Engineers Hans Herbert. By spanning two connected pontoons with a  deck, guns, vehicles, and troops could be transported. This idea evolved into the Herbert ferry. Only sixty-four of these pontoons were available, too few to consider mass-production.

Another type of closed-end pontoon was available in greater numbers. This was the heavy pontoon bridge (schwere Schiffsbrücke), of which 364 were in inventory. In the center, mounted on a pyramid-shaped truss-work, were two surplus aircraft engines end-to-end. This vessel was given the name kleine fähre ("small ferry") and initial testing was conducted on Rangsdorfer See, a lake near Berlin.

Chief of the Army General Staff General Franz Halder and a party of other Army officers were invited to witness one of these tests, but they were unimpressed by the ferry's performance. It could only make 4 knots and seemed overly flimsy. Halder noted "Nothing new, may not stand up in surf." Others in the party questioned whether transported soldiers would arrive in fighting condition.

This would serve as the vessel's cargo deck, and also provide longitudinal and lateral strength to withstand operating on the sea. This version would prove capable of surviving Force 6 waves.

The only propulsion systems available in the quantities for mass-production of these invasion craft were diesel truck engines and aircraft engines. In consultation with engineers from Pionier-Battalion 47, Siebel settled on a combination of four 75 hp Ford V-8 engines (two each mounted side-by-side in the aft end of the pontoons) linked to standard marine propellers. For auxiliary power, three BMW VI 750 hp aircraft engines could mount on elevated platforms along the aft edge of the cargo deck, turning airscrew propellers.

Early problems with this arrangement included engine failure due to insufficient cooling, solved by linking the water-cooled aircraft engines to the diesel truck engines via piping to the pontoon compartments. Steering the craft by water screws alone also presented difficulties. An engine telegraph connected the wheelhouse to the two pontoon engine crews. But because of the vessel's broad beam, the crews had to react simultaneously to requests for changes in speed or the ferry would begin turning, a movement the rudders could barely counteract.

On 31 August 1940, the new Siebel ferry was tested in the Ems estuary by the Special Command of the Merchant Shipping Division. In contrast to the truck engines in the pontoons, the aero engines were directly controlled by the helmsman via throttles in the wheelhouse, allowing him to vary each engine's RPM. This greatly improved maneuverability, but the aircraft engines were noisy, prevented voice communication on deck, and consumed large amounts of fuel. For Sea Lion, it was decided to use them only for the run-up onto the invasion beaches or as a back-up in the event the water screws were damaged.

On 4 September, two additional versions of the Siebel ferry, one powered by Opel Blitz truck engines and one powered by Ford V-8s were tested on the Ems estuary.

The Siebel ferry pontoons were flat-bottom and square in front. In combination with the vessel's wide cargo deck, this made for an exceptionally stable gun platform. The Luftwaffe mounted various-sized flak pieces on the ferries, and tested their suitability for engaging both air and surface targets while at sea. The versatile 8.8 cm guns proved well-suited for this role.

Series production of the Siebel ferry began in September 1940 at Antwerp as a joint Army–Luftwaffe venture with the Army's Böndel Pionier-Sonderkommando (Engineer Special Command) assembling the pontoons, decking and water propulsion while Col. Siebel's Luftwaffe-Sonderkommando installed the auxiliary aircraft engines. By late September, twenty-five of these craft were complete.

For Operation Sea Lion, the Luftwaffe organized the Siebel ferries into two flotillas: Flakkorps I (assigned to 9th Army) and Flakkorps II (assigned to 16th Army) to provide flank defense against air, ground, and surface targets for the First Wave tow formations. Each Siebel ferry could transport a complete flak unit consisting of one 8.8 cm gun and two 2 cm guns plus their three prime movers (although 9th Army planned to transport the necessary towing vehicles and support personnel separately via barges). Upon reaching the invasion beaches, the ferries could land their flak units, then assist with unloading the larger steamers anchored offshore. The Army referred to the Siebel ferries as "destroyer substitutes".

Wartime service

With its simplicity of design, sturdy construction, good sea-keeping, and the ease with which it could be disassembled and shipped via rail to virtually any point on the Continent, the Siebel ferry proved a useful and adaptable amphibious vessel for transporting troops, vehicles, and supplies across open water wherever needed by Germans. It was also easily-configured to serve a variety of purposes, from minelaying to convoy escort.

When Sea Lion was abandoned, in October 1940, the Luftwaffe decided, in the fall of 1941, to continue producing Siebel ferries independently of the Army under its 'Special Ferry Command' (Fähre-Sonderkommando). It replaced the diesel truck engines on the original design with BMW and other type aircraft engines, housing four of them in enlarged pontoon ends connected to water screws via a reversing gearbox. Some of these vessels were assigned to the Army and operated with mixed crews, but the Army disliked the use of aircraft engines, claiming they were prone to catching fire and consumed excessive amounts of fuel. The Army Engineer Ferry Construction Command at Antwerp continued using vehicle engines as the main propulsion unit, and considered them reliable compared to the Luftwaffe's aircraft engines. Ten were built for Operation Herkules, the planned invasion of Malta, although it was cancelled.

Two ferries were transferred to the Romanian Navy in late 1941. A wreck lies submerged in Croatia.

References

Bibliography

External links
 german Navy.de (English)
  Luftwaffen-Fährenflotillen

Landing craft
Ship types
 
Amphibious warfare vessels